Genoplesium superbum, commonly known as the Kangarooby midge orchid, is a species of small terrestrial orchid that is endemic to New South Wales. It has a single thin leaf and up to thirty two hairy, light reddish flowers which lean downwards and have a dark purple labellum.

Description
As with others in the genus, the flowers are inverted so that the labellum is above the column rather than below it. There is a dark purple callus in the centre of the labellum and covering about three-quarters of its surface. Flowering occurs from February to April.

Taxonomy and naming
The Kangarooby midge orchid was first formally described in 1991 by David Jones and the description was published in Australian Orchid Research. In 2002, Jones and Mark Clements changed the name to Corunastylis systena but that name is not accepted by the Australian Plant Census. The specific epithet (systenum) derived from the Ancient Greek word systenos meaning "tapering to a point", referring to the shape of the labellum of this orchid. (Kangarooby is a locality near Forbes.)

Distribution and habitat
Genoplesium systenum grows below shrubs in forested ridges and slopes on the ranges near Cowra, including the Conimbla National Park and Weddin Mountains National Park.

References

systenum
Endemic orchids of Australia
Orchids of New South Wales
Plants described in 1991